The 1999–2000 Argentine Primera División was the 109th season of top-flight football in Argentina. The season ran from August 7, 1999 to July 17, 2000. Instituto de Córdoba (champion of 1998–99 Primera B Nacional) and Chacarita Juniors (winner of "Torneo Reducido" after beating Juventud Antoniana in a two-legged series) were promoted from Primera B Nacional.

As Conmebol extended the number of 2000 Copa Libertadores clubs from 23 to 34, four Argentine clubs were eligible to play the tournament. As Boca Juniors and River Plate had already qualified, Rosario Central and San Lorenzo (2nd and 4th respectively) earned their right to play the Copa Libertadores. On the other hand, Talleres de Córdoba replaced Gimnasia y Esgrima to play the 1999 Copa Conmebol after the club from La Plata declined to participate.

At the end of Torneo Clausura, the best five placed teams earned right to play the 2001 Copa Libertadores while six participants of 2000 Copa Mercosur were eligible by similar system.

River Plate won both, Apertura and Clausura championships (totalising 31 league titles to date). For the first time in Primera División, a promotion and relegation system was introduced. The two teams with the worst average were directly relegated to the second division while teams placed 17th and 18th in average played two leg series each with two teams from Primera B Nacional.

As a result, three teams were relegated, Ferro Carril Oeste, Gimnasia y Esgrima (J) (worst averages) and Instituto (C) (lost promotion to Almagro). Belgrano remained in Primera after the series vs Quilmes ended 4–4 on aggregate.

Torneo Apertura

League standings

Top scorers

Torneo Clausura

League standings

Top scorers

Relegation

Relegation table

Promotion Playoffs 
For the first time in Primera División, a promotion playoff system was implemented in order to decide which teams would be promoted from the second division (or relegated from Primera División), apart from the two worst averages that were directly relegated. The system ruled that clubs with the third and four worst averages played a two-legged series versus two teams qualified from Primera B Nacional. In case of being tied on points, teams in Primera División would win the series.

Instituto and Belgrano (both from Córdoba) played the promotion playoff v Almagro and Quilmes (qualified from 1999–2000 Primera B Nacional) respectively. Belgrano remained in Primera División after a 4–4 tie because of the sporting advantage rule, while Almagro relegated Instituto after winning 3–1 on points, promoting to Primera División for the first time in its history.

See also
1999–2000 in Argentine football

Notes

References

Argentine Primera División seasons
Argentine Primera Division
Primera Division
Argentine
Argentine